The 2021 Toronto Argonauts season was the 63rd season for the team in the Canadian Football League and their 148th year of existence. The Argonauts improved on their 4-14 record from their previous season in 2019 with a win in week 10 against the Ottawa Redblacks on October 6, 2021. The team qualified for the playoffs for the first time since 2017, on October 30, 2021, with a win over the BC Lions. The Argonauts then clinched first place in the East Division after defeating the Hamilton Tiger-Cats on November 12, 2021. However, the Argonauts lost to the same Tiger-Cats in the East Final after holding a 12–0 halftime lead, but were unable to score a touchdown and lost 27–19.

This was the first full season with Michael Clemons as general manager following his appointment mid-way through the 2019 season. This was also the first season for head coach Ryan Dinwiddie.

An 18-game season schedule was originally released on November 20, 2020, but it was announced on April 21, 2021 that the start of the season would likely be delayed until August and feature a 14-game schedule. On June 15, 2021, the league released the revised 14-game schedule with regular season play beginning on August 5, 2021.

Offseason

CFL Global Draft
The 2021 CFL Global Draft took place on April 15, 2021. With the format being a snake draft, the Argonauts selected third in the odd-numbered rounds and seventh in the even-numbered rounds.  The team exchanged their third-round pick for a fourth-round pick as part of a three-player trade with the Calgary Stampeders.

CFL National Draft
The 2021 CFL Draft took place on May 4, 2021. The Argonauts had seven selections in the six-round snake draft and had the seventh pick in odd rounds and the third pick in even rounds. The team will acquired an additional fourth-round selection after trading Shawn Lemon to the BC Lions in exchange for Davon Coleman. The Argonauts also swapped their fifth-round pick for the Stampeders' sixth round-pick in a three-player trade and they exchanged sixth-round picks with the Blue Bombers in the trade for Cody Speller.

Preseason
Pre-season games were not played due to the shortening of the season.

Planned schedule

Regular season

Standings

Schedule
The Argonauts initially had a schedule that featured 18 regular season games beginning on June 19 and ending on October 30. The team was scheduled to be the home team for a neutral site game on July 10 for a match-up with the Calgary Stampeders. However, due to the COVID-19 pandemic in Canada, the Canadian Football League delayed the start of the regular season to August 5, 2021 and the Argonauts began their 14-game season on August 7, 2021.

On August 22, 2021, it was announced that the Edmonton Elks had several players test positive for COVID-19, so the August 26, 2021 game was postponed with the re-scheduled date to be declared once the Elks pass health and safety protocols. The CFL announced on September 2, 2021 that the game was re-scheduled for Tuesday, November 16, 2021, where the Argonauts originally had a bye week.

 Games played with colour uniforms.
 Games played with white uniforms.
† Game rescheduled from August 26 due to an outbreak of COVID-19 among Edmonton players.

Post-season

Schedule 

 Games played with colour uniforms.

Team

Roster

Coaching staff

References

External links
 

Toronto Argonauts seasons
2021 Canadian Football League season by team
2021 in Canadian football
2021 in Ontario